Jeff LoVecchio (born August 26, 1985) is an American professional ice hockey Left Wing who last played for the Nippon Paper Cranes of the Asia League Ice Hockey (ALIH).

Playing career
On March 18, 2008, LoVecchio was signed as a free agent to a two-year entry level contract by the Boston Bruins after attending the Western Michigan University and was assigned to their AHL affiliate, the Providence Bruins, for the remainder of the 2007–08 AHL season. In the off-season, however, LoVecchio sustained a concussion from skating and was forced to miss the entire 2008–09 season.

On December 9, 2010, he was traded from the Bruins, along with Jordan Knackstedt, to the Florida Panthers in exchange for Sean Zimmerman.

After his second season abroad with Lillehammer IK of the GET-ligaen, LoVecchio opted to change European leagues for the third consecutive year, signing a one-year contract with Hungarian club,  Alba Volán Székesfehérvár who compete in the EBEL on June 23, 2014.

LoVecchio returned for one season in the GET-ligaen with Lørenskog IK, before signing, alongside teammate Wacey Rabbit, to a one-year contract with Japanese club, Nippon Paper Cranes of the ALIH  on July 28, 2015.

Career statistics

References

External links

1985 births
Fehérvár AV19 players
HC Alleghe players
Lillehammer IK players
Living people
Lørenskog IK players
Nippon Paper Cranes players
Omaha Lancers players
Providence Bruins players
River City Lancers players
Rochester Americans players
San Antonio Rampage players
Utah Grizzlies (ECHL) players
Western Michigan Broncos men's ice hockey players
Ice hockey people from Missouri
American men's ice hockey left wingers